Patrik Lácha (born 20 January 1992) is a Czech football player who currently plays for Fk Č.L. Neštěmice. He has represented his country at youth international level. He was named in his country's 18-man squad for the 2011 UEFA European Under-19 Football Championship.

References

External links
 

1992 births
Living people
Czech footballers
Czech First League players
FK Teplice players
FK Ústí nad Labem players
FK Baník Most players

Association football midfielders